The Antonov An-14 Pchelka or Pchyolka, Bdzhilka ("Little Bee", NATO reporting name: Clod) is a Soviet utility aircraft which was first flown on 15 March 1958. It was a twin-engined light STOL utility transport, with two 300 hp Ivchenko AI-14RF radial piston engines. Serial production started in 1966, and about 300 examples were built by the time production ended in 1972. The An-14 failed to replace the more successful An-2 biplane, which was manufactured until 1990,  (the An-2 is still manufactured on special order). The An-14's successor, the An-28 with turboprop engines, is still manufactured at PZL Mielec factories in Poland, under the names PZL M28 Skytruck and PZL M28B Bryza.

With very stable flight characteristics, the An-14 could be flown by most pilots after a few hours of basic training. A small number of An-14s are still in airworthy condition.

History 
The development goal was a plane that was easy to fly and could be used as a light passenger and cargo transport as well as agricultural aircraft and air ambulance. The maiden flight took place on March 15, 1958. Aeroflot had planned to introduce the type in 1959 but the project was delayed by development problems with the Antonov An-10 which tied down the complete Antonov OKB, as well as issues with the An-14 prototype itself.

The An-14A went into production in 1965 in the state-owned aircraft factory No. 166 in Arsenyev. By now, it had different wings, a distinctly V-shaped tail plane and modified vertical stabilizers. In 1967, the type was presented at the milestone Domodedovo air show.

For aerial application in agriculture, it could be fitted with a  tank and spraying booms. The air ambulance version was able to accept six stretchers and one nurse. There was also a VIP version for five passengers. Other variants included the An-14B with retractable landing gear, as well as the An-14M with turboprop engines which was later developed into the Antonov An-28. The maiden flight of the An-14M took place in 1969. It received a stretched fuselage and high-lift wing. Like the An-14B, its prototype had been fitted with retractable landing gear, but that was dropped in the final production version.

Another unusual variant was the An-14Sh, which tested an air cushion landing gear for unprepared landing strips. While these tests were successful, the gear impaired the aerodynamics and only left minimal payload capacity. A precursor of the An-14Sh had been the An-714 with inflatable floats. In China, there was a smaller variant named Sha-Tu (or Capital) N°1.

15 An-14 were exported, four of which went to the East German Army in 1966. They were used by the Verbindungsfliegerstaffel 25 (aerial liaison squadron) of the East German Air Force in Strausberg, renamed to VS-14 in 1971, until 1980 or 1981. Two of these, 995 and 996, survive in the German Air Force Museum and the Airport Museum Cottbus.
 
Production ceased in 1976 after 332 units as the type proved impossible to replace the Antonov An-2.

Design 

A high-wing plane with struts, all variants except the An-14M are powered by two Ivchenko AI-14 air-cooled nine-cylinder radial engines. The strut-braced wing has automatic leading-edge slats and split flaps. Twin vertical stabilizers are mounted on the tips of the tail plane in the air stream of the propellers. The tricycle landing gear was not retractable in the original variant but could be fitted with skis for winter use. Short sponsons serve to mount the main gear. The fuselage is an all-metal semi-monocoquie design.

Operators

 Afghan Air Force - operated 12 from 1985 through 1991.

Balkan Bulgarian Airlines

East German Air Force

Mongolian People's Air Force - operated 2 from early 1970s through 1980s

Military of Guinea

Letalski center Maribor - civil operator YU-BCD crashed 1967

Soviet Air Force
Aeroflot

Specifications (An-14)

See also

References

Citations

Bibliography
 Stroud, John. Soviet Transport Aircraft since 1945. London:Putnam, 1968. .
 Taylor, John W. R. Jane's All The World's Aircraft 1976–77. London: Jane's Yearbooks. .

External links

 Walkaround An-14 from Aviatechnical museum, Lugansk, Ukraine
 Walkaround An-14 from Civil Aviation Museum, Ulyanovsk, Russia

An-014
1950s Soviet military utility aircraft
1950s Soviet civil utility aircraft
Aircraft first flown in 1958
Twin piston-engined tractor aircraft
Twin-tail aircraft